Sin or Shin is a Korean family name. It is cognate to the Chinese family names Shēn (申) and Xin (辛). According to the 2000 census in South Korea, there were 911,556 people with the surname Sin.

Clans
There are three Chinese characters that can be read as Sin. Between these three characters, there are six different Korean clans, each of which descends from a different ancestral founder. One of the six, the Yeongsan Sin clan, traces its origins to China. Members of the various Sin clans can be found throughout the Korean peninsula.

As with other Korean family names, the holders of the "Sin" family name are divided into various clans, each known by the name of a town or city, called bon-gwan in Korean. Usually that town or city is the one where the clan's founder lived. The six Sin branches are as follows:

 Pyeongsan Sin clan
 Goryeong Sin clan
 Aju Sin clan
 Saknyeong Sin clan
 Yeongsan Sin clan
 Samgal Sin clan
 Geochang Sin clan

Although the first four clans — Pyeongsan, Goryeong, Aju, and Saknyeong — share the same Chinese character (申), they are unrelated in heritage.

The Pyeongsan Sin clan lineage makes up about 70% of all those with the surname Sin using the Chinese character 申. The clan's founder was General Sin Sung-gyeom. This clan associated with a mountain in North Korea called "Pyeongsan" (literally "mountain of peace"). The mountain was originally named Samneungsan (literally "mountain of three talents"), without a family name, before being linked to the Sin surname by King Taejo of Goryeo.

According to the Pyeongsan Sin family legend, one day when King Taejo and his generals went out hunting near Pyeongsan, Taejo saw three geese flying above, and asked his generals whether any of them could shoot the geese down. Sin Sung-gyeom volunteered and asked Taejo which one he should shoot. Taejo asked Shin to shoot the third goose in its left wing and, to Taejo's surprise, Sin successfully felled the goose. Highly impressed, Taejo gifted Sin with 300 gyeol (an ancient measurement of area) of local land, which became Sin's hometown.

Sin Sung-gyeom also saved the life of King Taejo of Goryeo during a disastrous battle with Hubaekje near present-day Daegu in the early 10th century. Taejo awarded General Sin the clan name Pyeongsan Sin, after his hometown, for the loyalty and bravery he showed in the battle. Other prominent members of this clan include the 16th-century artist, writer, and poet Shin Saimdang and the 19th-century pansori writer Shin Jae-hyo.

Every year, a number of descendants of the Pyeongsan Sin clan gather at the memorial shrine of Sin Sung-gyeom in the South Korean province of Gangwon Province. Prior to the Korean war, the original shrine was situated in the now North-Korean province of Hwanghae Province, to which the clan land of Pyeongsan traces its roots.

Another well-known family line that also uses the Chinese character 申 is the Goryeong Sin clan, descended from Shin Suk-ju, the lead scholar working with King Sejong the Great in the development of Hangul, the Korean written language. Shin Suk-ju was also a high ranking government minister and belonged to the Hall of Worthies. The Goryeong Sin lineage makes up about 17% of all those with the surname. Three of five members of Shin Suk-ju's 16th generation are known to have immigrated to the United States in the 1970s, such as the physician David Sheen. Another prominent member of the clan is Danjae Shin Chaeho, a 19th-century nationalist historian.

List of Sins

Historical 

 Sin Sung-gyeom (died 927), general of the Later Three Kingdoms period.
 Sin Don (辛, died 1371), Buddhist monk and regent of the reign of King Gongmin of Goryeo.
 Sin Suk-ju (1417-1475), scholar and government minister
 Sin Saimdang (1504–1551), painter, calligrapher, Yi Yulgok's mother
 Shin Gwang-su (poet) (1712–1775), poet
 Sin Yun-bok (1758–?), painter also known as "Hyewon"
 Sin Chaeho (1880–1936), Korean independence activist, historian, nationalist and the founder of the nationalist historiography of Korea
 Shin Sung-mo (1891–1960), politician
 Shin Hyun-joon (1915–2007), military officer and diplomat
 Shin Ik-hee, politician (1st and 2nd National Assembly Chairman of Republic of Korea, opposition party leader, presidential candidate)
 Shin Kyuk-Ho (辛, 1922–2020), CEO and founder of Lotte Corporation

Contemporary
Paull Shin (1935–2021), South Korean-American politician and member of the Washington State Senate
Shin Dong-yeol (born 1980), South Korean rapper 
Shin Jae Chul (born 1936), martial artist
Shin Jung-hyeon (born 1938), rock guitarist and singer-songwriter
Nelson Shin (born 1939), founder and president of Akom Production, Ltd.
Shin Suk-ja (born 1942), is a South Korean political prisoner held in a  North Korean political prison camp
Sin Son Ho (born 1948), North Korean diplomat and Permanent Representative to the United Nations.
Oleksandr Sin (born 1961), Ukrainian politician and former mayor of Zaporizhia
Shin Youngok (born 1961) South Korean classical soprano singer
Shin Joon-Sup (1963), South Korean middleweight amateur boxer and Olympic Gold Medalist
Shin Daechul (born 1967), South Korean rock/heavy metal guitarist and leader of Sinawe
Shin Hae Chul (1968-2014), singer
Shin Hong-Gi (born 1968), South Korean former football player
Shin Hyun-joon (born 1968), South Korean actor
Shin Seung Hun (born 1968), South Korean ballad singer
Shin Ae-ra (born 1969), actress
Shin Tae-Yong (born 1970),  South Korean attacking midfield footballer
Shin Dong-yup (born 1971), South Korean comedian and host
Shin Jeong-ah (born 1972), survivor of the Sampoong Department Store collapse who later lied about her academic credentials
Nelly Shin (born 1972), first Korean-Canadian Member of Parliament
Shin Ha-kyun (born 1974), South Korean actor
Shin Jung-hwan (born 1975), Korean singer and entertainer
Shin Myung-Chul (born 1978), second baseman in Korean baseball
Shin Hye Sung (born 1979), member of the group Shinhwa
Crush, (born Shin Hyo-seob, 1992), singer, rapper
Outsider (born Shin Ok-Cheol, 1983), singer
Shin Hwa-Yong (born 1983), South Korean football player
Shin KwangHo (born 1983), South Korean artist
Shin Min Ah (born 1984), South Korean actress and model. 
Shindong (born Shin Donghee, 1985), singer, dancer, member of Super Junior
Shin Hyung-Min (born 1986), South Korea football player
Shin Kwang-Hoon (born 1987), South Korean football defender
Shin Young-Rok (born 1987), South Korean football player
Jiyai Shin (born 1988), professional golfer
Shin Baek-cheol (born 1989), South Korean badminton player
Sin Joon-sik (born 1980), South Korean taekwondoist and Olympic silver medalist
Shin Se-kyung (born 1990), South Korean actress
Shin Dongho (born 1994), South Korean singer, ex-member of South Korean boy band U-KISS
Shin Ji-soo (born 1994), South Korean singer and actress, ex-member of South Korean girl group D.Heaven
Shin Kuhn, past director general of National Intelligence Service (South Korea)
Peter Shin, director of animation films, most notably "Family Guy" 
Hyejeong (Sin Hyejeong, born 1993), singer and actress, member of South Korean girl group AOA
Shin Jimin (born 1991), former singer and rapper, former member of South Korean girl group AOA
Shin Dongwoo, South Korean singer, member of South Korean boy group B1A4
Shin Dong-hyuk (申, born 1982), is a North Korean refugee and human rights activist living in South Korea
Shin Hyun-soo (born 1989), South Korean actor 
Shin Won-ho (born 1991), South Korean actor and member of South Korean multinational boy band Cross Gene
Peniel Shin (born 1993), South Korean-American singer, rapper, member of South Korean boy band BtoB
Jeena Shin (born 1973), South Korea-New Zealand artist
Shin Su-ran (born 1986), South Korean singer
The Quiett (born Shin Dong-gab), South Korean Rapper, composer, lyricist and record producer (co-founder of independent hip-hop label Illionaire Records)
Shin Ye-eun (born 1998), South Korean actress
Shin Hye-sun (born 1989), South Korean actress
Shin Hyun-been (born 1986), South Korean actress
Shin Eun-soo (born 2002), South Korean actress
Shin Jin-seo (born 2000), a professional South Korean Go player
Hyun Ji Shin (born 1996), South Korean fashion model
Shin Woo-hyun (born 2004), South Korean racing driver

Fictional
 Stephen Shin, a character of DC Comic series Aquaman
 Shin Kyung-soo, one of the two female leads of 2003 South Korean drama Rosemary
 Shin Ji-hyun, main character of 2011 South Korean drama 49 Days
 Shin Suk-ki, the main protagonist of 2004 South Korean movie Shinsukki Blues
 Shin Ji-hoon, one of main characters of 2012 South Korean television series I Need Romance 2012
 Shin Joo-yeon, female lead of 2014 South Korean series I Need Romance 3
 Shin Ji-min, real name of Song Yi-kyung, a main character from 2011 South Korean drama 49 Days
 Shin Chae-kyung, female lead of 2017 South Korean drama Queen for Seven Days
 Shin Se-gi, split personality of Cha Do-hyun, a DID patient and main character of 2015 South Korean television series Kill Me, Heal Me
 Shin Ha-kyung, female lead of 2014 South Korean series Punch
 Shin Suk-ho, main lead of 2016 South Korean series Entertainer
 Shin Woo Yeo, main lead of 2021 South Korean series My Roommate Is a Gumiho
 Shin Young-joo, female lead of 2017 South Korean drama Whisper
 Shin Sang, male character of 2021 South Korean series Mouse
 Shin Ah-ri, one of the female leads of 2021 South Korean series No Matter What

See also
Korean name
Korean language
List of Korean family names

Korean-language surnames